The Washington Land Group is a geologic group in Greenland. It preserves fossils dating back to the Silurian period.

See also 

 List of fossiliferous stratigraphic units in Greenland

References

External links 
 

Geologic groups of Europe
Geologic groups of North America
Geologic formations of Greenland
Silurian Greenland